Listed below are the UCI Women's Teams that compete in 2015 women's road cycling events organized by the International Cycling Union (UCI), including the 2015 UCI Women's Road World Cup.

Teams overview

The country designation of each team is determined by the country of registration of the largest number of its riders, and is not necessarily the country where the team is registered or based.

Riders
This is a list of riders riding for the UCI Women's Teams in 2015 sorted by team.

Alé–Cipollini

. Ages .

Astana–Acca Due O

. Ages .

BePink LaClassica

. Ages .

Bigla Pro Cycling Team

. Ages .

Bizkaia–Durango

. Ages .

. Ages .

Boels–Dolmans Cycling Team

. Ages .

BTC City Ljubljana

. Ages .

China Chongming-Liv-Champion System Pro Cycling

. Ages .

Feminine Cycling Team

. Ages .

Hitec Products

. Ages .

Inpa Sottoli Giusfredi

. Ages .

Itau Shimano Ladies Power Team

. Ages .

Lensworld.eu–Zannata 

. Ages .

Lointek

. Ages .

Lotto Soudal Ladies

. Ages .

Matrix Fitness Pro Cycling

. Ages .

No Radunion Vitalogic

. Ages .

Optum p/b Kelly Benefit Strategies

. Ages .

Orica–AIS

. Ages .

Parkhotel Valkenburg Continental Team

As of 1 January 2015. Ages as of 1 January 2015.

Pepper Palace p/b The Happy Tooth

. Ages .

Poitou–Charentes.Futuroscope.86

. Ages .

Rabo–Liv Women Cycling Team

. Ages .

S.C. Michela Fanini Rox

. Ages .

Servetto Footon

. Ages .

Team Liv–Plantur

. Ages .

Team Rytger

. Ages .

Team TIBCO-SVB

. Ages .

Top Girls Fassa Bortolo

. Ages .

Topsport Vlaanderen–Pro-Duo

. Ages .

Twenty16 presented by Sho-Air

. Ages .

UnitedHealthcare Professional Cycling Team

. Ages .

Vaiano Fondriest

. Ages .

Velocio-SRAM

. Ages .

Wiggle–Honda

References

2015
2015 UCI Women's Road World Cup